PM Satheesh  is an Indian film sound designer, sound editor and mixer. In 1999 he received the National award for best sound recording and design for his work on Kumar Talkies. He has worked in Hollywood, Hindi, Telugu, Tamil and Malayalam films.

Biography 

He was born in Kerala, India. He is a graduate of the Film and Television Institute of India or FTII, Pune, India. He has worked as sound recordist and sound designer on numerous documentaries for BBC, Channel 4, National Geographic, National Film Board of Canada and the CBC and feature films like 15 Park Avenue and Dreaming Lhasa, Mangal Pandey: The Rising and Fakir of Venice. For six years he held exclusive contract for MTV India for sound on live music events and broadcast.
He is Chief sound designer and founder of Fireflys Post Sound P.M Satheesh has over two decades of experience in location sound and sound design.
PM Satheesh established Scuba Location Sound, painstakingly putting together high end location sound equipment and a dozen freelance sound recordists working under his guidance. This set up allowed Scuba to record location sound for documentaries and television where there was hardly any time for post dubbing.Braving all logistical nightmares PM Satheesh used Pro Tools on location in the Himalayas for a multi track hard disk based recording for the Tibetan feature film Dreaming Lhasa.

P.M Satheesh is working for S.S Rajamouli’s Baahubali, scheduled to have been released in April 2015. Regarding his experience with the film, he said "Baahubali is one of the very few films in South where a lot of importance is being given to sound recording. We dropped the idea of shooting with sync sound since the dialogue delivery has to be modified accordingly. The sound design team embeds various types of micro-phones throughout the set to record the ambient sound, which will lend a natural feel to the film. It's necessary, because some of these sounds aren't available in the market. It's quite a challenge for everyone".

Filmography

References

 The New York Times P.m Satheesh
   https://web.archive.org/web/20141031212603/http://baahubali.com/news/our-sound-designer-pm-satheesh-watching-rushes-of-the-movie-to-help-him-get-started/
 The New York Times P.m Satheesh
 Cannes 2014 P.M Satheesh
 best audiography National Film Award 46th

External links
 
 
 P. M. Satheesh profile at Firefly Post Sound website
 Baahubali 
 P. M. Satheesh at Fandango 

Living people
Film and Television Institute of India alumni
Indian sound designers
Musicians from Kannur
Film musicians from Kerala
21st-century Indian musicians
Year of birth missing (living people)
Indian sound editors